The Thistle Mountains are a mountain range in Guangxi, China that is part of the  Dayao Mountains (:zh:大瑤山). They are mostly concentrated in Guiping County. In the 1840s the area was the primary base of the God Worshipping Society, which eventually launched the Taiping Rebellion against the Qing dynasty.

References

Landforms of Guangxi
Mountain ranges of China